Nina Minttu Maria Tikkinen (born 6 February 1987) is a retired Finnish ice hockey player. She played with the Finnish national team from 2004 until 2014 and won bronze medals at the 2010 Winter Olympic Games and at the 2008 and 2009 IIHF Women's World Championships.

Tikkinen played NCAA hockey with the Minnesota State Mavericks of Minnesota State University, Mankato from the 2007–08 season to the 2010–11 season. She played in the Finnish Naisten SM-sarja with TPS Turku and Kärpät Naiset.

Playing career

Finland
She spent three years competing with the Finnish national team and selected Rookie of the Year in 2003–04. She participated in the 2007 World Championships and the 2006 Four Nations Tournament as a member of Finland's National Team. In 2006–07, she tallied three goals and four assists for seven points for her club team, Karpat Oulu. Tikkinen joined three fellow Western Collegiate Hockey Association players: two from Minnesota Duluth and one from Minnesota on the 2010 Olympic team roster. There was also one from Ohio State of the CCHA.

Tikkinen also played with Finland in the 2013 Women's World Championship.

Minnesota State Mavericks
In 2008–09, Tikkinen played in 28 games for the Mavericks. Her rookie season was 2007–08, and she finished the season as the top freshman scorer with 5 goals, 6 assists and 11 points. Her first  multi-point game was on Feb. 9, 2008 (two assists) was the first of her collegiate career. The first goal of her NCAA career was scored on October 13, 2007 at Connecticut. On November 5 and 6, 2010, Tikkinen accumulated five points as the Mavericks won back-to-back conference games against St. Cloud State. Tikkinen had three points on November 5.  The three points were all assists on Minnesota State's first three scores, including teammate Kathleen Rogan's game-winning goal in the first period. The following day, Tikkinen gave the Mavericks a 2–0 lead midway through the second period. The two victories gave Minnesota State their first home ice series sweep since October 31-November 1, 2008 when they beat Bemidji State.

On November 12 and 13, Nina Tikkinen produced a four-goal, five-point series as the Mavericks won twice on the road against league rival Ohio State. For her efforts, she was named WCHA Player of the Week for the second straight time. Tikkinen had two goals and one assist for three points as Minnesota State won by a 5–3 tally on November 12. Both of her goals tied the game (2–2 in the second period, 3–3 in the third). On November 13, she broke a 3–3 tie with a game-winning goal with only 3:45 left. Tikkinen now has a four-game winning streak. It also marked her second straight five-point weekend.

Career statistics

Finland

Minnesota Mankato

Awards and honors
WCHA Scholar-Athlete, 2009
All-WCHA Academic Team, 2009
WCHA Offensive Player of the Week (Week of November 10, 2010) 
WCHA Offensive Player of the Week, (Week of November 17, 2010)

References

1987 births
Living people
Finnish women's ice hockey forwards
Ice hockey players at the 2010 Winter Olympics
Ice hockey players at the 2014 Winter Olympics
Medalists at the 2010 Winter Olympics
Minnesota State Mavericks women's ice hockey players
Olympic bronze medalists for Finland
Olympic ice hockey players of Finland
Olympic medalists in ice hockey
People from Salo, Finland
Sportspeople from Southwest Finland
Minnesota State University, Mankato alumni